The Local Government Act 1974 of New Zealand consolidated the previous law relating to local government that applied to territorial local authorities, regional and district council bodies in New Zealand.

The Act made provision for the establishment of:

unitary authorities
regional councils (which were not established until the 1989 local government reforms)
district councils
district community councils
community councils
local authority trading enterprises

The Act consolidated and amended the Municipal Corporations Act 1954, the Counties Act 1956, the Local Authorities (Petroleum Tax) Act 1970, and provisions of other Acts of the Parliament of New Zealand relating to the powers and functions of regional councils, united councils, and territorial local authorities.

The legislation is the legal basis for the governances of the cities, districts and regions of New Zealand.

Although most of the Act was repealed when the Local Government Act 2002 was enacted, some sections, providing for the management of roads, transport, navigation, drainage, rivers and waste management, still apply.

See also
 Local Government Act 2002 (New Zealand)
 Territorial authorities of New Zealand
 Local Government New Zealand
 List of cities in New Zealand

References

External links
Local Government Act 1974
List of subsequent acts
Encyclopedia of the Nations : New Zealand : Local Government

Statutes of New Zealand
1974 in New Zealand law
Local government legislation
History of local government in New Zealand